Sharon E. Har is an American politician and a Democratic member of the Hawaii House of Representatives since January 2013 representing District 42. Har served consecutively from January 2007 until 2013 in the District 40 seat.

Early life and education
Har was born in Springfield, Illinois to Korean American parents Chester Chiduk Ha and Katherine Kyunhee Ha.

Har earned a BA in political science and sociology at Mount Holyoke College, attended William S. Richardson School of Law for a semester, and earned her JD from John Marshall Law School.

Elections
2020 - On August 8, 2020, Har defeated Vickie L.P. Kam with 4,080 votes (69.0%) during the Democratic primary and was subsequently elected because there was no Republican nominee.
2018 - On August 11, 2018, Har defeated Jake Schaefer with 3,018 votes (74.5%) during the Democratic primary and was subsequently elected because there was no Republican nominee.
2016 - Har ran unopposed and won the uncontested election during the primary with 2,690 votes (85,1%) on August 13, 2016.
2014 - Har won the August 9, 2014 Democratic Primary with 2,883 votes (70.1%).  On November 4, 2014, Har defeated Suk Moses, wife of former Representative Mark Moses, with 5,134 votes (69.1%) against Moses' 2,073 votes (27.9%).
2012 - Redistricted to District 42, and with Democratic Representative Rida Cabanilla redistricted to District 41, Har and Marissa Capelouto, her 2010 Republican opponent, were both unopposed for their August 11, 2012 primaries, setting up a rematch; Har won the November 6, 2012 General election with 6,251 votes (70.4%) against Capelouto.
2010 - Har won the September 18, 2010 Democratic Primary with 3,743 votes (75.3%), and won the November 2, 2010 General election with 6,170 votes (65.1%) against Republican nominee Marissa Capelouto.
2008 - Har was unopposed for the September 20, 2008 Democratic Primary, winning with 2,576 votes, and won the November 4, 2008 General election with 7,294 votes (66.1%) against Republican nominee Jack Legal.
2006 - Challenging incumbent Republican Representative Mark Moses for the District 40 seat, Har won the September 26, 2006 Democratic Primary with 2,558 votes (62.7%), and won the November 7, 2006 General election with 3,997 votes (51.7%) against Moses.

References

External links
Official page at the Hawaii State Legislature
Campaign site
 

Place of birth missing (living people)
Year of birth missing (living people)
Living people
Ewha Womans University alumni
Harvard University alumni
Hawaii lawyers
Democratic Party members of the Hawaii House of Representatives
Mount Holyoke College alumni
William S. Richardson School of Law alumni
Women state legislators in Hawaii
American women lawyers
21st-century American politicians
21st-century American women politicians
American women of Korean descent in politics
Asian-American people in Hawaii politics